The Los Angeles Police Department (LAPD), officially known as the City of Los Angeles Police Department, is the municipal law enforcement agency of Los Angeles, California, United States. With 9,974 officers and 3,000 civilian staff, it is the third-largest municipal police department in the United States, after the New York City Police Department and the Chicago Police Department.

The LAPD is headquartered at 100 West 1st Street in the Civic Center district, not far from the demolished Parker Center it replaced in 2009. The department's organization and resources are complex, including 21 divisions (stations) grouped in four bureaus under the Office of Operations; multiple divisions within the Detective Bureau under the Office of Special Operations; and specialized units such as the Metropolitan Division, Air Support Division, and Major Crimes Division under the Counterterrorism and Special Operations Bureau. Further offices support the Chief of Police in areas such as constitutional policing and professional standards, while the Office of Support Services covers facilities management, personnel, and training, among other areas.

Independent investigative commissions have documented a history of police brutality, corruption, misconduct, and discriminatory policing within the LAPD. In 2001, the United States Department of Justice entered into a consent decree with the LAPD regarding systemic civil rights violations and lack of accountability that stretched back decades; following major reforms, the decree was lifted in 2013.

History 

The first specific Los Angeles police force was founded in 1853 as the Los Angeles Rangers, a volunteer force that assisted the existing Los Angeles County Sheriff's Department (LASD). The Rangers were soon succeeded by the Los Angeles City Guards, another volunteer force. Neither the Rangers nor the Guards were particularly efficient, and Los Angeles became known for its violence, gambling, and vice.

The first paid force was created in 1869, when six officers were hired to serve under City Marshal William C. Warren. By 1900, under John M. Glass, there were 70 officers, one for every 1,500 people. In 1903, with the start of the Civil Service, this force was increased to 200.

In 1910, LAPD Officer Alice Stebbins Wells became the first sworn female police officer in the United States. Officer Georgia Ann Robinson, hired in 1916, was the first African-American female police officer.

Severe corruption issues within the LAPD and the rest of the city government lasted until the 1940s. In 1933, the Reserve Unit was formed, tasked with crime suppression; it would later evolve into the Metropolitan Division. In 1946, the top-secret Gangster Squad was formed to combat the American Mafia and Los Angeles crime family.

During World War II, under Clemence B. Horrall, the overall number of personnel was depleted by the demands of the military. Despite efforts to maintain numbers, the police could do little to control the 1943 Zoot Suit Riots.

Horrall was replaced by retired United States Marine Corps general William A. Worton, who acted as interim chief until 1950, when William H. Parker succeeded him, serving until his death in 1966. Parker advocated police professionalism and autonomy from civilian administration. However, the Bloody Christmas scandal in 1951 led to calls for civilian accountability and an end to alleged police brutality. In 1965, under Parker, Officer John Nelson and then-Inspector Daryl Gates established the Metropolitan Division's Special Weapons and Tactics (SWAT) unit, the first such unit in American law enforcement, as well as the Special Investigation Section, a highly-secretive tactical stakeout unit. That same year, the Watts riots were sparked by police abuse.

In the 1970s and 1980s, street gangs became a growing issue in Los Angeles; in response, the LAPD established the Community Resources Against Street Hoodlums (CRASH) gang intelligence unit in 1979, conducting Operation Hammer in 1987. In the 1990s, corruption and misconduct within the LAPD was revealed to the public: the 1991 Rodney King beating led to the 1992 Los Angeles riots, while the 1997 Rampart scandal led to the disbandment of CRASH. Also in 1997, outgunned LAPD officers in North Hollywood were locked into a lengthy shootout with heavily armed and armored bank robbers, prompting police armament upgrades across the United States.

Over the course of its existence, the LAPD absorbed numerous smaller police forces in Greater Los Angeles, including the LACMTA Police in 1997 and the Los Angeles General Services Police in 2012. The LAPD has made numerous attempts to absorb the Los Angeles Airport Police and Los Angeles Park Ranger Division, though all such attempts failed or did not proceed, and no mergers have been made since 2012.

Organization 

The Los Angeles Board of Police Commissioners, also known as the Police Commission, is a five-member civilian body that oversees the LAPD. The Chief of Police reports to the board and the rest of the department reports to the chief.

The Office of the Inspector General (OIG) is an independent part of the LAPD that has oversight over the department's internal disciplinary process and reviewing complaints of officer misconduct. It was created by the recommendation of the Christopher Commission and it is exempt from civil service and reports directly to the Board of Police Commissioners. The current Inspector General is Mark P. Smith, who was formerly the Constitutional Policing Advisor for the LASD. The OIG receives copies of every complaint filed against members of the LAPD as well as tracking specific cases along with any resultant litigation. The OIG also conducts audits on select investigations and conducts regular reviews of the disciplinary system in order to ensure fairness and equality. As well as overseeing the LAPD's disciplinary process, the Inspector General may undertake special investigations as directed by the Board of Police Commissioners.

The LAPD's Art Theft Detail "is the only full-time municipal law enforcement unit in the United States devoted to the investigation of art crimes." The longtime head and often sole member of the unit is Detective Don Hrycyk, who in 2014 was described as being a 40-year veteran of the department with twenty years as the only known full-time art detective in the United States. According to the LAPD, the unit has recovered over $121 million in stolen works since 1993. The Art Theft Detail is part of the Burglary Special Section of the Detective Bureau of the LAPD.

The Los Angeles Police Protective League (LAPPL) is the labor union for LAPD officers up to the rank of lieutenant.

The LAPD Cadet Program is the department's police explorer program. The program was formerly called the explorer program but was changed after the police commission broke off their partnership with the Boy scouts over policies barring homosexuals, atheists, and agnostics from being troop leaders. The cadet program shifted focus from an old explorer program that tried to guide members to a career in law enforcement, to a program that tries to give cadets a solid foundation in life and to help them prepare for careers by offering services such as tutoring and college scholarships. The cadets complete courses not only on law enforcement but also on citizenship, leadership, financial literacy and other different skill sets. Cadets work positions including ride-alongs, crowd control, charity assistance, and working in stations. The cadet program has posts at all of the LAPD's regional divisions as well as specialized divisions including the Metropolitan Division and the communications division. As of 2014 there were 5,000 cadets.

Office of the Chief 
The Office of the Chief of Police has the responsibility for assisting the Chief of Police in the administration of the department.

The Director of the Office of Constitutional Policing and Policy, currently Police Administrator III Lizabeth Rhodes reports directly to the Office of the Chief. This office was created as a result of the Department of Justice's federal consent decree. It develops the LAPD's policies and procedures, conducts internal auditing and programs to ensure compliance, handles litigation, forms and ensures compliance with the LAPD's long-term strategic plan and risk management strategies, and coordinates local, state, and federal government and legislative matters.

Office of Operations 

The majority of the LAPD's approximately 10,000 officers are assigned within the Office of Operations, whose primary office is located in the new Police Administration Building. Headed by an Assistant Chief, currently Assistant Chief Beatrice Girmala, and the Assistant to the Director, who is a Commander, the office comprises four bureaus and 21 police stations, known officially as "areas" but also commonly referred to as "divisions". The Office of Operations also has a dedicated Homeless Coordinator reporting directly to the Assistant Chief. The Community Engagement Group also reports to the Assistant Chief.

The 21 police stations or "divisions" are grouped geographically into four command areas, each known as a "bureau". The latest areas, "Olympic" and "Topanga", were added on January 4, 2009.

The Office of Special Operations is an office that was created in 2010 by then-Chief Charlie Beck. Headed by an Assistant Chief, currently Assistant Chief Horace Frank, the office comprises the Detective Bureau, the Counterterrorism and Special Operations Bureau, and the Transit Services Bureau.

The Detective Bureau also houses the COMPSTAT (Computer Statistics) Division which maintains crime data. COMPSTAT is based on the NYPD CompStat unit that was created in 1994 by former LAPD Chief William Bratton, while he was still a NYPD Police Commissioner. He implemented the LAPD version on becoming Chief of Police in 2002.

The Counterterrorism and Special Operations Bureau provides the Los Angeles Police Department specialized tactical resources in support of operations during daily field activities, unusual occurrences and, especially, during serious disturbances and elevated terrorism threat conditions. It was created from the merger of the Counterterrorism and Criminal Intelligence Bureau with the Special Operations Bureau in 2010

The Transit Services Bureau supervises the Transit Services Group and the Traffic Group, responsible for overseeing the four Geographical Traffic Divisions.

Headquarters Building 

Prior to 2009, LAPD headquarters was located at Parker Center, named after former chief William H. Parker, which stood at 150 N. Los Angeles St. in the Downtown Los Angeles Civic Center district. It was demolished in 2019.

The Police Administration Building, also known as the New Parker Center, replaced the original Parker Center in October 2009. It is located at 100 West 1st Street, also in the Civic Center, occupying the entire block between Main, Spring, 1st, and 2nd streets, immediately south of Los Angeles City Hall. Daniel, Mann, Johnson & Mendenhall were the architects.

The total cost of the new building complex including the data center, the Main Street Parking Structure, and the Aiso Public Parking Garage was $437 million. It is LEED-certified, uses energy-efficient mechanical systems, daylighting, high-performance glass, and recycled or renewable building materials. The perimeter is lined with green space. The complex provides space for about 2,300 workers, which let the department consolidate functions here which had been spread out across multiple locations.

Ranks

Demographics

Up to the Gates administration, the LAPD was predominantly white (80% in 1980), and many officers had resided outside the city limits. Simi Valley, the Ventura County suburb that later became infamous as the site of the state trial that immediately preceded the 1992 Los Angeles riots, has long been home to a large concentration of LAPD officers, most of them white. A 1994 ACLU study of officers' home zip codes concluded that over 80% of police officers resided outside the city limits.

Hiring quotas began to change this during the 1980s, but it was not until the Christopher Commission reforms that substantial numbers of black, Hispanic, and Asian officers began to be hired on to the force. Minority officers can be found in both rank-and-file and leadership positions in virtually all divisions.

In 1910 the LAPD hired the first female police officer with the power to arrest in the United States, Alice Stebbins Wells. LAPD's first Latina officer, Josephine Serrano Collier, was hired in 1946. On the LAPD through the early 1970s, women were classified as "policewomen".

Through the 1950s, their duties generally consisted as working as matrons in the jail system or dealing with troubled youths working in detective assignments.  Rarely did they work any type of field assignment, and they were not allowed to promote above the rank of sergeant.

A lawsuit by a policewoman, Fanchon Blake, in the 1980s instituted court-ordered mandates that the department was to begin actively hiring and promoting women police officers in its ranks.  The department eliminated the rank of "policeman" from new hires at that time along with the rank of "policewoman".  Anyone already in those positions was grandfathered in, but new hires were classified instead as "police officers", which continues to this day. In 2002, women made up 18.9% of the force.

In 1886, the department hired its first two black officers, Robert William Stewart and Roy Green. The LAPD was one of the first two police departments in the country to hire an African-American woman officer, Georgia Ann Robinson in 1919. Despite this, the department was slow at integration. During the 1965 Watts riots, only 5 of the 205 police assigned to South Central Los Angeles were black, despite the fact that it was the largest black community in Los Angeles. Los Angeles' first black mayor, Tom Bradley was a former LAPD officer, and quit the department after being unable to advance past the rank of lieutenant like other black police officers in the department. When Bradley was elected mayor in 1972, only 5% of LAPD officers were black and there was only one black captain in the department, Homer Broome. Broome would break down racial barriers on the force going on to become the first black officer to obtain the rank of commander and the first black station commander, leading the Southwest Division.

As of 2019, the LAPD had 10,008 sworn officers. Of these, 81% (8,158) were male and 19% (1,850) female. The racial/ethnic breakdown:
 48.8% or 4,882 was Hispanic/Latino (of any race)
 30.9% or 3,090 was non-Hispanic White
 9.62% or 962 was African American
 7.66% or 766 was Asian
 2.46% or 246 was Filipino American
 remaining were Indian and Other Ethnicities

The LAPD has grown over the years in the number of officers who speak languages in addition to English. There were 483 bilingual or multilingual officers in 1974, and 1,560 in 1998, and 2,500 in 2001 that spoke at least one of 32 languages. In 2001, a study was released that found that non-English-speaking callers to the 911 and non-emergency response lines often receive no language translation, often receive incomplete information, and sometimes receive rude responses from police employees. The issue of a lack of multilingual officers led to reforms including bonuses and salary increases for officers who are certified in second languages. Currently, over a third of LAPD officers are certified in speaking one or more languages other than English. The department also uses a device called the phraselator to translate and broadcast thousands of prerecorded phrases in a multitude of languages, commonly used to broadcast messages in different languages from police vehicles.

Work environment and pay 

LAPD patrol officers have a three-day 12-hour and four-day 10-hour work week schedule. The department has over 250 types of job assignments, and each officer is eligible for such assignments after two years on patrol. LAPD patrol officers almost always work with a partner, unlike most suburban departments surrounding the City of Los Angeles, which deploy officers in one-officer units in order to maximize police presence and to allow a smaller number of officers to patrol a larger area.

The department's training division has three facilities throughout the city, including the Los Angeles Police Academy (Elysian Park), Ahmanson Recruit Training Center (Westchester), and the Edward Davis Training Center (Granada Hills).

From spring 2007 through the spring of 2009, new recruits could earn money through sign on bonuses ranging from $5,000 to $10,000. Those bonuses ended in 2009. Sign on bonuses were paid 1/2 after graduation from the academy, and 1/2 after completion of probation. $2,000 could be added for sign ons from outside the Los Angeles area for housing arrangements. As of July 2009, new recruits earned starting salaries of $56,522–61,095 depending on education level, and began earning their full salary on their first day of academy training.

In January 2010, the starting base salary for incoming police officers was lowered by 20%. At the time If applicants had graduated from high school their starting salary would be $45,226, if they had at least 60 college units, with an overall GPA of 2.0 or better, their salary would start at $47,043, and if the applicant had fully completed a college degree, the salary would start at $48,880. In 2014 after negotiations between the city and the police officers union reached an agreement on police officer pay that would give pay increases to nearly 1,000 officers who joined the department since the salaries for incoming officers were cut. The agreement also raised starting salaries for officers to $57,420 with an additional increase to $60,552 after 6 months which would become effective in the beginning of 2015. The agreement would also change the current overtime payment system from a deferred payment system, which was implemented to cut costs, to a pay-as-you-go overtime system as well as increasing the overtime budget from $30 million to $70 million.

Resources

Vehicles 

The LAPD operates a wide variety of police cars, primarily the Ford Police Interceptor Utility, Ford Crown Victoria Police Interceptor, and Dodge Charger, with limited numbers of the Ford Police Interceptor Sedan, Chevrolet Impala, and Chevrolet Tahoe/Suburban, among an assortment of other models. Police motorcycles are primarily the BMW R1200RT-P and Harley-Davidson FLHP. The LAPD SWAT's primary vehicle is the Lenco BearCat.

Aviation

The LAPD's aircraft consist of 19 helicopters ("airships")—5 Bell 206 Jet Rangers and 14 Eurocopter AS350-B2s—and 1 Beechcraft King Air 200.

LAPD aircraft are operated by the LAPD Air Support Division. Main airship missions are flown out of Hooper Heliport, located near Union Station. The LAPD also houses air units at Van Nuys Airport.

Body cameras 
Beginning in September 2013, the LAPD started a trial program for the use of body-worn cameras with 30 officers in the Skid Row area. Reports from the trial program indicated that the cameras functioned well and that they assisted in deescalating situations although there were some technical issues with the cameras along with slight issues with the cameras falling off of officers during movement. In November 2014, the LAPD chose Taser International as the vendor for body cameras to be used by officers after their trial program earlier in the year. On December 16, 2014, Mayor Eric Garcetti announced that the city would purchase 7,000 body worn cameras from Taser for use by the department. Patrol officers are now equipped with the cameras, and are required to use these devices while on assignment. 700 of the cameras were deployed to patrol officers in the Central, Mission and Newton patrol areas of the city beginning in January 2015. $1.55 million was raised from private donors to start the body camera program for the initial rollout phase in order to ease budget constraints for the city with another $1 million coming from the National Institute of Justice, a branch of the Department of Justice. Before all of the cameras were deployed to patrol officers, the Police Commission created a policy that governs the use of the cameras and video footage while consulting with department and city officials along with outside organizations including other departments who already use body cameras. The commission has created a policy that officers would have to turn on the cameras whenever they arrest or detain someone for interrogation and that many public interactions such as domestic violence interviews would not be recorded. Prior to the rollout of any body worn cameras, officers were able to carry personally owned audio recording devices since 1994 if they filed an application and obtained the requisite permission.

Firearms
After World War II, the LAPD began to issue the Smith & Wesson Model 10. During the 1960s and 70s the department issued the S&W Model 15 Combat Masterpiece. These guns were modified to fire double-action only. Some specialized units (specifically Motor Officers) were issued the stainless steel version, the Model 67. In the 1980s, LAPD patrol officers began to be issued the Beretta 92F and Smith & Wesson Model 5906 semi-automatic 9mm pistols. Following the 1997 North Hollywood shootout, LAPD officers were given the option of carrying the Smith & Wesson Model 4506 and 4566 service pistols. When William Bratton was Chief, he allowed officers to carry the Glock, the firearm carried in the two previous departments Bratton led (the New York City Police Department and the Boston Police Department).

As of 2023, the LAPD issues the FN 509 MRD-LE and Smith & Wesson M&P to all new officers, alongside a variety of Glock, Kimber, Staccato, or Beretta pistols. Officers are also issued long guns, including the Remington 870 and Benelli M4 Super 90 shotguns, as well as Smith & Wesson, Colt, or Bushmaster AR-15 rifles. The LAPD also has riot guns capable of firing 37mm munitions and bean bag rounds.

LAPD SWAT used the Kimber Custom TLE II as their sidearms in 2002, renaming it the Kimber LAPD SWAT Custom II. As of 2014, SWAT's primary weapons were the Heckler & Koch HK416, M4 carbine, and FN SCAR rifles; the Colt 9mm and HK MP5 submachine guns; the Armalite AR-10, Remington 700, Barrett M82, and M14 sniper rifles; and the Benelli M4 and Remington 870 shotguns.

Awards and commendations 
The department presents a number of medals to its members for meritorious service. The LAPD awards medals for bravery, service, unit citations, ribbons for assignment and time-specific service, and marksmanship.

 Medal of Valor

The LAPD Medal of Valor is the highest law enforcement medal awarded to officers by the Los Angeles Police Department. The Medal of Valor is an award for bravery, usually awarded to officers for individual acts of extraordinary heroism performed in the line of duty at extreme and life-threatening personal risk.

Public opinion

In a 2020 survey of Los Angeles residents, two-thirds said they believe the department is doing a good job maintaining public safety, while 88% supported community policing, 82% supported an unarmed response model, and 62% supported redirecting some money from the department to community initiatives. There were differences of opinion along racial lines, with three in five white and Asian residents and one in three black residents trusting the LAPD to "do what is right".

Corruption and misconduct
Over the years, the Los Angeles Police Department has been the subject of a number of scandals, misconduct, and other controversies. According to one study, during the lengthy tenure of William H. Parker as police chief (1950–1966), the LAPD was "outwardly racist", and the tenure of police chief Daryl Gates (1978–1992) was marked by "scandalous racist violence" among the LAPD. Following the Rampart Division CRASH scandal of the late 1990s and early 2000s, the United States Department of Justice entered into a consent decree with the LAPD regarding systemic civil rights violations and lack of accountability that stretched back decades, requiring major reforms. The consent decree was lifted in 2013. The executive director of the American Civil Liberties Union of Southern California stated that the decree "accomplished its purpose by and large" and that the department "has made serious culture changes", but cautioned against backsliding and said there was more work to be done regarding racial disparities and treatment of the homeless.

1920s–1940s
Louis Oaks, a chief of the LAPD in the early 1920s, was a member of the Ku Klux Klan.

James E. Davis served two terms as LAPD police chief, heading the department from 1926 to 1929 and from 1933 to 1938. During his first term as chief, Davis called for violence against criminals while leading a Prohibition vice squad, and the department was known for controversies including accusations of conspiracy, blackmail, and murder. Davis also formed a Red Squad to combat labor unions; headed by Capt. William F. Hynes, the squad arrested hundreds participating in strikes. In March 1928, Christine Collins reported her nine-year-old son, Walter, missing. Five months later a boy named Arthur Hutchins came forth claiming to be Walter; when Mrs. Collins told the police that the boy was not her son, she was committed to a mental institution under a Section 12 internment. It was later determined that Walter had fallen victim to a child rapist/murderer in the infamous Wineville Chicken Coop Murders, and Arthur Hutchins admitted that he had lied about his identity in order to meet his favorite actor, Tom Mix. The widely publicized case was depicted in the 2008 film Changeling.

When Frank L. Shaw was elected mayor in 1933, he reappointed Davis as police chief, and the LAPD––already considered "nationally notorious" for police corruption––entered a new phase of widespread criminal activity. In 1936, Davis sent members of the LAPD to California's state borders, along Arizona, Nevada, and Oregon, to institute checkpoints blocking the entry of migrants, or "okies". The police began raids and mass arrests of populations including the homeless and disabled; those taken in by police were given the option of leaving California or serving a 180-day jail term. The so-called "bum blockade" ended after significant negative publicity, including a suit filed by the ACLU in federal court.

By 1937, the LAPD was leading a vast intelligence operation wiretapping politicians, judges, and federal agents. Some records of police surveillance were taken under subpoena after Harry Raymond, a former officer investigating corruption in the force, was the victim of a car bomb. During the trial that followed, LAPD captain Earl Kynette was found guilty of Raymond's attempted murder; Davis acknowledged that he had known Raymond was under police surveillance.

In the late 1930s, the LAPD engaged in widespread racial profiling of Mexican Americans. The LAPD and the Los Angeles County Sheriff's Department used the 1942 "Sleepy Lagoon murder" of José Gallardo Díaz to justify a coordinated crackdown: the police identified primarily-Mexican American communities, cordoned them off with blockades, and carried out mass searches and arrests. The police detained hundreds of Mexican Americans before indicting 22 for murder. Twelve of the defendants were charged with murder and incarcerated; all convictions were later overturned. Members of the LAPD were accused of participating in anti-Mexican American violence during the Zoot Suit Riots that followed in 1943; despite the LAPD's insistence that the riots were caused by Mexican American crime, there was broad consensus that the riots were the result of racial discrimination.

1950s–1960s

Parker, who served as chief of the LAPD from August 9, 1950, until his death on July 16, 1966, was frequently criticized for racist remarks, his refusal to acknowledge police brutality, and his demands that the police not be subject to the same laws as citizens; the last of these contributed to ongoing conflicts with the FBI, with the agency refusing to train LAPD officers until after Parker's death. Parker adopted the rhetoric of Los Angeles as the "white spot" of America, first popularized by Los Angeles Times publisher Harry Chandler, and explicitly set it against the "black picture" of the nation. The Los Angeles City Council once confronted him with a recording in which he referred to Mexican Americans as not being far from "the wild tribes of Mexico"; in the 1960s, he claimed that "by 1970, 45% of the metropolitan area of Los Angeles will be Negro" and that the city should support a strong police force because "if you don't, come 1970, God help you"; he described Black participants in the 1965 Watts riots as acting like "monkeys in a zoo". The Los Angeles Police Department was not integrated until the 1960s.

Early in his tenure as police chief, Parker launched an extensive public relations campaign for the LAPD. In the 1950s, he was a credited consultant for police procedural drama Dragnet, even offering the show departmental support in providing case examples and fact-checking; he popularized the term "thin blue line" in both his speeches and in a TV show he conceived and produced for Los Angeles NBC network KNBC; he hired Star Trek creator Gene Roddenberry as a speech writer; and he introduced the department's first press office. These efforts were seen as tied to his efforts to curry public favor and extend the reach of officers of the LAPD.

Bloody Christmas was the name given to the severe beating of seven civilians under LAPD custody on December 25, 1951. The attacks, which left five Hispanic and two white young men with broken bones and ruptured organs, was only properly investigated after lobbying from the Mexican American community. The internal inquiry by chief Parker resulted in eight police officers being indicted for the assaults, 54 being transferred, and 39 suspended.

In 1962, the controversial LAPD shooting of seven unarmed members of the Nation of Islam resulted in the death of Ronald Stokes, and led to protests of the LAPD led by Malcolm X and the Nation of Islam.

1970s–1980s
In the 1970s and into the 1980s "biased policing", also known as racial profiling, was commonplace in the department. This policing alienated the department from minority residents and gained the department a reputation of abuse of power and bias against minority residents.

A major controversy erupted in 1979 over the shooting of Eula Love by two LAPD officers; no legal consequences befell the officers responsible.

Early in his tenure as Chief of Police, Daryl Gates re-instituted the use of the chokehold (placing an arm or flashlight over someone's throat) in order to subdue suspects. In 1982, this technique was used and led to the death of James Mincey Jr. Following Mincey's death, the Police Commission barred the use of chokeholds by officers unless in a life-threatening situation. An investigation found that sixteen people had died after being restrained by police chokeholds.

In 1986, Officer Stephanie Lazarus killed her ex-boyfriend's new wife. Despite the victim's father's insistence that Lazarus should be a suspect in the homicide, she was not considered by the police and the case went cold. In the 2000s, detectives revisiting cold cases deduced that Stephanie was a suspect. DNA evidence led to her arrest and conviction.

Also in 1986, the department purchased a 14-ton armored breaching vehicle, used to smash quickly through the walls of houses of suspects. The ACLU questioned the constitutionality of the vehicle, and the California Appellate Court later ruled the vehicle was unconstitutional, violating lawful search and seizure.

In 1988, African American baseball sportscaster and retired Baseball Hall of Fame player Joe Morgan was detained at Los Angeles International Airport by LAPD and L.A. Airport Police officers after being falsely identified as a drug dealer. He was released when the LAPD realized their mistake. The city cleared the detective of wrongdoing, but Morgan subsequently filed a civil suit against both the LAPD and the city for the unlawful detention; the lawsuit was settled in 1993, and Morgan was awarded $800,000 by the Los Angeles City Council.

On August 1, 1988, as part of Chief Gates' Operation Hammer directed against gangs, SWAT teams raided four apartments at 39th Street and Dalton Avenue. According to an investigation by the department's Internal Affairs, the team leader, Captain Thomas Elfmont, directed his men to "hit" the apartments "hard", to "level" them, and to leave them "uninhabitable". The police detained 37 people, making seven arrests. They found six ounces of marijuana and a small amount of cocaine. The seven were beaten by the police and at the police station forced to whistle the theme to the Andy Griffith Show. Those who refused to comply were beaten again. Nobody was charged with a crime. The city paid four million dollars to settle the matter.

On September 4, 1988, LAPD officers raided the home of Roger Guydon looking for drugs. They found nothing. In 1991, Guydon won a $760,000 lawsuit against the city.

1990s–2000s: Rodney King, LA riots, consent decree 

In April 1991, the Christopher Commission was formed in the wake of the Rodney King beating, by then-mayor of Los Angeles Tom Bradley. It was chaired by attorney Warren Christopher and was created to examine the structure and operation of the LAPD. The commission found that there were a significant number of LAPD officers who used excessive force and that the disciplinary structure was weak and ineffective. Fewer than a third of the suggested reforms were put into place.

In an effort to reduce drive-by shootings, LAPD initiated Operation Cul-de-Sac in 1991. This consisted of installing barriers on residential streets to block vehicle traffic. As a result, homicides and assaults were greatly reduced. The program ended after two years, with violent crime rates returning to their previous levels.

On July 1, 1992, John Daniels Jr., 36, a tow truck driver, was fatally shot by LAPD Officer Douglas Iversen as he was driving away from a service station in South Central. Iversen was charged with second-degree murder, and two separate juries were deadlocked on the charge. The case was dismissed by a judge.  Daniels' family received a $1.2 million settlement after filing a lawsuit against the City of Los Angeles.

The Los Angeles riots of 1992, also known as the Rodney King uprising or the Rodney King riots, began on April 29, 1992, when a jury acquitted four LAPD police officers accused in the videotaped beating of Rodney King following a high-speed car pursuit on March 3, 1991. After seven days of jury deliberations, the jury acquitted all four officers of assault and acquitted three of the four of using excessive force. The evening after the verdict, thousands of people in the Los Angeles area rioted for over six days following the verdict. Widespread looting, assault, arson, and murder occurred, and property damages totaled one billion dollars. In all, 53 people died during the riots.

On October 12, 1996, LAPD Officers Rafael Pérez and Nino Durden entered the apartment of Javier Ovando. They shot Ovando in the back, paralyzing him from the waist down. They then planted a gun on the unarmed Ovando to make it appear he had attacked them. The two officers then perjured themselves. Ovando was sentenced to 23 years in custody based on their testimony. Later, one of the officers admitted his crime. Ovando was released, and in 2000, was paid $15 million for his injuries and imprisonment. The officers' actions led to the exposure of the Rampart scandal. By 2001, the resulting investigations would lead to more than 75 officers being investigated or charged, and over 100 criminal cases being overturned, due to perjury or other forms of misconduct, much based on the plea-bargain testimony of Perez.

Following the Rampart scandal, the United States Department of Justice entered into a consent decree with the LAPD regarding systemic civil rights violations and lack of accountability that stretched back decades. Many in the LAPD resisted federal oversight and proposed reforms, but entered into a consent decree when the DOJ threatened to sue the city and take complete control over the LAPD. Mayor Richard J. Riordan and the Los Angeles city council agreed to the terms of the decree on November 2, 2000. The federal judge formally entered the decree into law on June 15, 2001. In order to promote civil rights integrity, the legally binding decree placed emphasis on several areas, including management and supervisory measures, revising critical incident procedures, documentation, investigation and review, revising the management of gang units, revising the management of confidential informants, program development for response to persons with mental illness, improving training, increased integrity audits, increasing the operations of the Police Commission and the Inspector General, and increasing community outreach and public information.

Other provisions in the decree called for divisions to investigate all use of force (now known as Force Investigative Division) and conduct audits department-wide; the development of a risk management system; the creation of a field data capture system to track the race, ethnicity or national origin of the motorists and pedestrians stopped by the department; the creation of an Ethics Enforcement Section within the Internal Affairs Group; the transfer of investigative authority to Internal Affairs of all serious personnel complaint investigations; a nationwide study by an independent consultant on law enforcement dealing with the mentally ill, to help the department refine its own system; a study by an independent consultant of the department's training programs; and the creation of an informant manual and database.

The Consent Decree Bureau was the LAPD bureau charged with overseeing this process. Until 2009, the commanding officer of the Consent Decree Bureau, a civilian appointed by the chief of police, was Police Administrator Gerald L. Chaleff.

In 2006, the consent decree was extended by six years, as U.S. District Court Judge Gary Feess found that the LAPD had not implemented the reforms that it had committed to. The federal oversight of the LAPD was lifted in 2013.

On July 10, 2005, while under the influence of alcohol and cocaine, Jose Pena took his 19-month-old daughter, Suzie, hostage in his home. After police arrived, Pena threatened to kill her and himself after firing at others earlier. SWAT officers were called in. After negotiations to try and release Pena's daughter were unsuccessful, four SWAT officers entered the home and, during a gunfight, both Mr. Pena and his infant daughter were shot and killed by SWAT team members. One officer was shot and wounded by Pena. Suzie Pena's death was the first death of a hostage ever in LAPD SWAT history and the LAPD was criticized for their actions. An independent board of inquiry later cleared the SWAT officers of any wrongdoing. A judge later dismissed a lawsuit by the mother of Suzie Pena on the grounds that the officers acted reasonably in the case and no negligence was involved.

In 2003, the LAPD arrested Juan Catalan after a 16-year-old girl was shot dead. Catalan was sentenced to death after a witness stated that he looked like the killer. Catalan turned out to be innocent; it was footage shot for the sitcom Curb Your Enthusiasm which showed him at Dodger Stadium, showing him watching a baseball game with his family, that exonerated him.

On May Day, 2007, immigrant rights groups held rallies in MacArthur Park in support of undocumented immigrants. The rallies were permitted and initially the protesters followed the terms of the permits but some of the protesters began blocking the street. After warnings by the LAPD, the protesters failed to disperse and the rally was declared an unlawful assembly. The LAPD only announced the declaration of the unlawful assembly in English leading to confusion by some in the crowd who only spoke Spanish. Police officers held a line to prevent protesters from entering the street and did not disperse the crowd until rocks, bottles, and other objects began to be thrown at the police. The officers began slowly advancing and fired rubber bullets and used batons to disperse crowd members who refused to comply with police orders to leave the area. Police were heavily criticized for firing rubber bullets at some journalists and hitting some with batons who did not disperse along with the crowds. Seventeen officers and two sergeants of the metropolitan division were recommended for punishment by a department internal review for their actions in the incident.

In 2008, Officer Russell Mecano offered to not arrest a woman in exchange for sex, and offered cash to another woman in exchange for sex. He was convicted and sentenced to more than eight years.

2010s–2020s
On July 22, 2012, Alesia Thomas, an African American woman, died in the back of a police car after being kicked in the upper thigh, groin, and abdomen. Her cause of death was ruled "undetermined", and the autopsy report mentioned cocaine intoxication as a "major" contributing factor, but also indicated that the struggle with officers "could not be excluded" as a contributing factor to her death. It was later revealed that Thomas was also determined to have bipolar disorder. Later, LAPD officer Mary O'Callaghan was charged with assault over her actions in the case. As a result of these events, on September 1, 2012, civil rights activists requested an emergency meeting with LAPD Chief Charlie Beck to review arrest and use-of-force policies.

On August 18, 2012, Ronald Weekley Jr., a college student, was punched in the face while being arrested after being stopped for riding his skateboard on the wrong side of the street.

On August 21, 2012, Michelle Jordan, a registered nurse, was pulled over for holding her cell phone while driving. She was thrown to the ground twice in the course of being arrested after getting out of the car and refusing to comply with an officer's command to get back in the vehicle.

On February 7, 2013, the LAPD was involved in what Chief Beck called "a case of mistaken identity" when, during the manhunt for murderer and fired LAPD officer, Christopher Dorner, the LAPD and the Torrance Police Department fired upon pickup trucks at two separate locations, believing them to be Dorner. The first incident took place on the 19500 Block of Redbeam Avenue. LAPD officers fired numerous shots into the back of a blue pickup truck, allegedly without warning, and injured the two women inside. Twenty-five minutes later, the Torrance Police shot into the windshield of another pickup truck, narrowly missing the driver. In both cases the victims were not involved with the Dorner case. The Dorner case involved allegations of impropriety by other LAPD officers, as Dorner alleged that he had been fired for reporting brutality by his training officer. The manhunt was triggered by Dorner's alleged attacks against LAPD and ex-LAPD personnel. In 2013, the city of Los Angeles agreed to pay the two female victims of the first incident $2.1 million each to settle the matter. The city of Torrance agreed to pay the victim of the second incident $1.8 million.

In May 2014, after much controversy in their own city, the Seattle Police Department transferred two Draganflyer X6 UAVs to the LAPD. The LAPD stated that the only uses for the drones would be for narrow and prescribed circumstances such as hostage situations, but that they would not be put into use until the Board of Police Commissioners and the City Attorney crafted a policy for their use after the LA City Council ordered the policy creation. The decision to use the drones gained significant opposition from community activists including the ACLU and new groups founded after the announcement about drone use including Stop LAPD Spying Coalition and the Drone-Free LAPD, No Drones, LA! activist groups who protested outside of city hall against the use of drones by the LAPD.

On August 11, 2014, an African-American man named Ezell Ford was shot by two LAPD gang detectives after they made an investigative stop of Ford on the street. Ford was unarmed and the officers claimed that he got into a physical struggle with one of them and then reached for their gun, forcing them to fire on Ford, while some witnesses who claimed to have seen the incident alleged that there was no struggle. The autopsy report was ordered to be released by Mayor Eric Garcetti before the end of 2014.

On September 11, 2014, African-American actress Danièle Watts was temporarily detained by the LAPD when she and her boyfriend were in Studio City. Watts accused the officers who stopped her of racially profiling her because she was African-American and her boyfriend was Caucasian, claiming that they treated her as if she was a "prostitute" and that the officers had been disrespectful to her because she was African-American. LAPD Sergeant Jim Parker who was one of the two officers accused by Watts of misconduct, released a personal audio recording of the entire incident to TMZ. The recording showed that police had received a 911 call about lewd acts in a car and the couple who were described to have committed the lewd acts fit Watts' and her boyfriend's description. It also showed that when officers arrived on the scene, Watts' boyfriend cooperated with police but Watts refused to cooperate and identify herself, accused the officers of racism, and ignored officers requests and walked away from them leading to her being handcuffed and temporarily detained. Following the release of the recording, local civil rights activists called for Watts to apologize to the LAPD for falsely accusing them of racial profiling but Watts refused. The two officers were cleared of any wrongdoing by the department shortly after the release of the audio recordings.

In October 2014, the LAPD Office of the Inspector General released a report that members of the department had been using department computers to falsely inflate the number of officers and patrol cars that were on duty at any given time in a method known as "ghost cars". The report found that supervisors of various ranks would check officers into vacant assignments right before the department's computerized patrol software did its head count and then log the officers off when the count was done. The report found that the practice occurred in at least five out of 21 patrol divisions, and the report also highlighted the causes including understaffing in the LAPD.

In 2018, LAPD officers Louis Lozano and Eric Mitchell were fired for misconduct, making false statements, and violating the public's trust over their actions during an armed robbery in 2017. On April 15, 2017, Lozano and Mitchell were on duty when they received a call for an armed robbery at a nearby Macy's. Despite being close to the scene, the officers remained parked in an alleyway; Sergeant Jose Gomez, patrol sergeant for that shift, asked that the officers respond to the robbery, but they did not reply. While being questioned over the incident, Lozano and Mitchell claimed they could not hear the call due to loud music from a nearby park. When Sergeant Gomez reviewed their vehicle recordings, he found the officers were distracted by the mobile game Pokémon Go, and that they ignored the robbery call and left their patrol jurisdiction to continue playing the game. Lozano and Mitchell attempted to appeal their firing, arguing their vehicle recordings were used improperly as evidence, but the California Second District Court of Appeal rejected their appeal.

In June 2020, following a campaign by a coalition of community groups including Black Lives Matter, Los Angeles mayor Eric Garcetti announced LAPD budget cuts of $150 million. Garcetti announced the funds would be redirected to community initiatives. Senator Kamala Harris supported Garcetti's decision to cut the LAPD's budget.

In 2020, the Los Angeles County District Attorney's Office announced that six LAPD officers had been charged with conspiracy and falsifying information in a false gang labeling scandal, with an additional 18 officers under investigation. The discovery of false accusations led to the review of hundreds of cases and the dismissal of a number of felony charges dating back to 2016.

On February 13, 2021, the LAPD announced in a series of tweets it was launching an internal investigation into the Harbor Division, after their employees allegedly passed around a Valentine's Day-themed e-card depicting George Floyd with the caption "You take my breath away", which made reference to Floyd's murder. The LAPD said it "will have zero tolerance for this type of behavior".

On June 30, 2021, an LAPD bomb disposal squad detonated confiscated illegal fireworks in a residential neighborhood, injuring 17 people, causing extensive damage to nearby houses, and destroying the LAPD's bomb disposal truck. The explosion reportedly occurred when the bomb squad significantly underestimated the weight of the fireworks that were loaded into the truck's blast chamber. 42 pounds of fireworks were loaded into the blast chamber; however, it was only designed to sustain 15 pounds of explosives, with a maximum of 25 pounds (though this would disable the truck). The LAPD was criticized for carelessly handling explosives and detonating them in a neighborhood; Chief Moore publicly apologized during a news conference, informing reporters the bomb squad had begun implementing new procedures to prevent similar incidents in the future.

In September 2021, The Guardian reported that LAPD officers had been instructed by Chief Michel Moore to collect social media account information from all citizens they interview, whether or not they have been accused of committing a crime. Further, officers were asked to collect Social Security numbers and instructed to tell individuals that they "must be provided" under federal law, although it is unclear if this is true. In a response for comment, the LAPD stated that the field interview policy was "being updated". An updated policy instructs officers not to collect Social Security numbers.

Fallen officers 

Since the establishment of the Los Angeles Police Department, 220 officers have died in the line of duty. In 2008, Randal Simmons became the first LAPD SWAT officer to be killed in the line of duty.

There have been two memorials to fallen LAPD officers. One was outside Parker Center, the former headquarters, which was unveiled on October 1, 1971. The monument was a fountain made from black granite, its base inscribed with the names of deceased LAPD officers. The old monument located at Parker Center was destroyed in the process of being transported but was replaced by a new memorial at the Police Administration Building, the Los Angeles Police Department Memorial for Fallen Officers, dedicated on October 14, 2009. The memorial is made up of more than 2,000 brass alloy plaques, 207 of which are inscribed with the names of fallen police officers. Two deaths are unsolved, both of off-duty officers: Fred Early, shot in 1972, and Michael Lee Edwards, shot in May 1974.

In addition to the numbers listed above, 8 police officers, and 2 other LAPD employees, died due to COVID-19 complications.

In popular culture 

Los Angeles' relationship with the American film industry and entertainment industries led to the LAPD being prominently featured in popular media. Combined with news stories relating to them, the LAPD's image was effectively broadcast worldwide, making them a well-known archetype of urban American law enforcement. The LAPD occasionally sanctioned works that depicted them positively.

LAPD-sanctioned media 
One of the earliest notable representations of the LAPD in media was the CBS radio drama Calling All Cars, which hired LAPD radio dispatcher Jesse Rosenquist to voice the series' dispatcher.  Rosenquist was already famous because home radios could tune in to early police radio frequencies; as the first police radio dispatcher presented to the public ear, he was the voice that actors went to when called upon for a radio dispatcher role. Chief James E. Davis also presented the show, and many of its plotlines were based on actual incidents the LAPD had handled, a concept that would be a staple of most future LAPD-sanctioned works.

Jack Webb produced the Dragnet franchise, following LAPD Detective Sergeant Joe Friday, in cooperation with the LAPD. Dragnet, which started as a late-1940s radio drama and moved into television in the 1950s and 1960s, was the first major mass media representation of the LAPD. Real LAPD operations inspired Webb to create the series, and close cooperation with LAPD officers let him make it as realistic as possible, including authentic police equipment, sound recording on-site at police facilities, and access to LAPD case files for story plotlines.  The popularity of Dragnet's 1950s television adaptation made then-Chief William H. Parker "the most well-known and respected law enforcement official in the nation" aside from J. Edgar Hoover. The 1960s television series aired under Chiefs Thomas Reddin and Edward M. Davis, and oriented from straightforward crime-solving to internal matters and community policing, per Reddin's attempts to improve the LAPD's community relations.

Adam-12, also produced by Webb, followed a pair of LAPD patrol officers, running from 1968 to 1975, longer than Dragnet's 1960s run. The show familiarized the American public with LAPD operations and procedure, and made the several of the LAPD's organizational quirks, such as their black-and-white paint scheme and "protect and serve" motto, widely recognizable and symbolic of American policing.

Media featuring the LAPD

Films and television 
Films prominently featuring the LAPD and its officers include Traffic with the Devil (1946), Assault on Precinct 13 (1976), Blade Runner (1982), Blue Thunder (1983), Dragnet (1987), the Lethal Weapon series (1987–1998), Colors (1988), Die Hard (1988), Predator 2 (1990), One False Move (1992), Demolition Man (1993), Speed (1994), Heat (1995), L.A. Confidential (1997), Rush Hour (1998), Training Day (2001), 44 Minutes: The North Hollywood Shoot-Out (2003), S.W.A.T. (2003), Crash (2004), Lakeview Terrace (2008), Rampart (2011), End of Watch (2012), Gangster Squad (2013), Let's Be Cops (2014), Bright (2017), and Crown Vic (2019).

Television series featuring the LAPD include Columbo (1968), Hunter (1984), The Shield (2002), The Closer (2005), Southland (2009), NCIS: Los Angeles (2009), Law & Order: LA (2010), Major Crimes (2012), Lucifer (2016), Angie Tribeca (2016), Bosch (2017), S.W.A.T. (2017), The Rookie (2018), 9-1-1 (2018), and L.A.'s Finest (2019).

Video games 
Video games featuring the LAPD (or entities based on the LAPD) include Police Quest: Open Season (1993), the first three SWAT games (1995–1999), Future Cop: LAPD (1998), Police 911 (2000), True Crime: Streets of LA (2003), Grand Theft Auto: San Andreas (2004), Midnight Club: Los Angeles (2008), L.A. Noire (2011), Grand Theft Auto V (2013), and Need for Speed (2015).

See also 

 Crime in Los Angeles
 Law enforcement in Los Angeles County
 List of law enforcement agencies in California

References

Further reading
 Appier, Janis. Policing women: The sexual politics of law enforcement and the LAPD (Temple UP, 1998).
 Brayne, Sarah. 2020. Predict and Surveil: Data, Discretion, and the Future of Policing. Oxford University Press.
Bultema, James A.  Guardians of Angels: A History of the Los Angeles Police Department Anniversary Edition, 1869-2019 (2019) excerpt from 2013 edition
 Cannon, Lou. Official negligence: How Rodney King and the riots changed Los Angeles and the LAPD (Westview Press, 1999).
 Domanick, Joe. To protect and to serve: the LAPD's century of war in the city of dreams (Pocket, 1995).
 Domanick, Joe. Blue: the LAPD and the battle to redeem American policing (Simon and Schuster, 2016). excerpt
 Felker-Kantor, Max. Policing Los Angeles: Race, Resistance, and the Rise of the LAPD (U of North Carolina Press, 2018) online review
 Gates, Daryl F., and Diane K. Shah. Chief: My life in the LAPD (Bantam, 1993).
 Jenks, David A., J. Scott Carter, and Catherine A. Jenks. "Command Staff Leadership Training and Job Commitment in the LAPD." Southwest Journal of Criminal Justice 4.2 (2007). online
 Lasley, James R., and Michael K. Hooper. "On racism and the LAPD: was the Christopher commission wrong?." Social Science Quarterly (1998): 378–389.
 Maya, Theodore W. "To Serve and Protect or to Betray and Neglect: The LAPD and Undocumented Immigrants." UCLA Law Review 49 (2001): 1611+.
 Reese, Renford. Leadership in the LAPD: Walking the tightrope (Carolina Academic Press, 2005).
 Stone, Christopher, Todd S. Foglesong, and Christine M. Cole. "Policing Los Angeles under a consent degree: The dynamics of change at the LAPD" (Program in Criminal Justice Policy and Management, Harvard Kennedy School, 2009) online.

External links 

 

 
1869 establishments in California
Government agencies established in 1869
Municipal police departments of California